Great Escape is a multidirectional shooter published for the Atari 2600 in 1983. It  was produced by Bomb, a line of video games from developer Onbase Co. based out of Asia. It received mixed-to-negative reviews from critics, with reviewers making comparisons with Defender and Asteroids.

Gameplay
The player controls a spaceship that can move in the four cardinal directions and destroy enemy ships and asteroids. A radar screen shows where adversaries may be located, and a "super-alien" will destroy the player if it appears on the same screen as the player's ship. The game is single-player only.

Reception
TV Gamer magazine criticised the graphics, compared it negatively to other games from Bomb such as Assault, and described it as "without a doubt, one to avoid". Videogaming Illustrated compared it to Asteroids. German magazine TeleMatch gave it 3/6 overall, with 2/6 for gameplay but 4/6 for sound (6 being "worst").

References

1983 video games
Atari 2600 games
Atari 2600-only games
Video games developed in Japan